Osawatomie High School (OHS) is a public high school in Osawatomie, Kansas, United States.  It is operated by Osawatomie USD 367 school district.  Its mascot is Trojans, and the school colors are red and white. The principal is Jeff White, and the assistant principal/athletic director is Wade Welch. Located at 1200 Trojan Drive, the current enrollment in grades 9-12 is 310 students.

Administration
Osawatomie High School is currently under the leadership of Principal Jeff White.

Extracurricular activities
The Trojans compete in the Pioneer League and are classified as a 4A school, the third-largest classification in Kansas, according to the Kansas State High School Activities Association. Many graduates have gone on to participate in Division I, Division II, and Division III athletics.

Athletics

Fall
 Cross Country
 Fall Cheerleading
 Football
 Volleyball

Winter
 Boys Basketball
 Winter Cheerleading
 Boys Swimming
 Wrestling

Spring
 Baseball
 Golf
 Softball
 Girls Swimming
 Track and Field

Clubs

 Art Club
 Band
 Choir
 Class Officers
 Debate Team
 DAZZLERS
 Drama Club
 FCCLA
 FFA
 KAY Club
 Renaissance
 SADD
 Scholar's Bowl
 Science Club
 Student Council
 Gaming Club

Technology
As part of a program initiated in 2005, OHS provides a 1:1 laptop program, meaning every high school student gets a laptop to use at school and home during the school year. The overall objective of the program is to provide access to technology for all students. The program is intended to increase student learning, increase student achievement, and better prepare students to face the challenges of the digital work force.

Notable alumni
 Lynn Dickey (class of 1967) – NFL quarterback (Houston Oilers, Green Bay Packers)
Derrick Jensen (class of 1974) – NFL tight end for the Oakland Raiders and scout for the Seattle Seahawks

See also
 List of high schools in Kansas
 List of unified school districts in Kansas

References

External links
School
 Osawatomie High School Website
 District Website
Maps
 Osawatomie city map, KDOT
 Miami County map, KDOT

Public high schools in Kansas
Schools in Miami County, Kansas
1893 establishments in Kansas